Big is a 2012 South Korean television series starring Gong Yoo and Lee Min-jung. The romantic comedy/body swap series aired on KBS2 from June 4 to July 24, 2012 on Mondays and Tuesdays at 21:55 for 16 episodes.

Written by the Hong sisters, Big was Gong Yoo's first television series after The 1st Shop of Coffee Prince in 2007 and since being discharged from mandatory military service. The drama was well-received although it was criticized for its ending.

Synopsis
Gil Da-ran (Lee Min-jung) is a struggling substitute teacher trying to get her certificate. She is engaged to a kind and handsome doctor, Seo Yoon-jae (Gong Yoo); it is a fairy-tale-come-true until one month before the wedding, Yoon-jae inexplicably becomes distant. At the same time, Da-ran meets an 18-year-old transfer student from the United States, Kang Kyung-joon (Shin Won-ho), who's got an attitude towards everyone except Da-ran. Kyung-joon gets into a fateful car accident with Yoon-jae and the two of them drive over the guard rail and into the deep waters. Yoon-jae tries to save Kyung-joon but in the process, Yoon-jae ostensibly dies and Kyung-joon ends up in a coma. Kyung-joon soon wakes up finding himself in Yoon-jae's body.

Cast

Main
Gong Yoo as Kang Kyung-joon / Seo Yoon-jae 
Lee Min-jung as Gil Da-ran 
 Bae Suzy as Jang Ma-ri
Shin Won-ho as Kang Kyung-joon

Supporting
Baek Sung-hyun as Gil Choong-shik, Da-ran's brother 
Jang Hee-jin as Lee Se-young
Kim Seo-ra as Ahn Hye-jung, Yoon-jae's mother 
Ahn Suk-hwan as Gil Min-kyu, Da-ran's father
Yoon Hae-young as Lee Jung-hye, Da-ran's mother 
Jo Young-jin as Seo In-wook, Yoon-jae's father 
Choi Ran as Kim Young-ok, vice principal
Moon Ji-yoon as Na Hyo-sang, PE teacher
Shin Ji-soo as Lee Ae-kyung, math teacher and Da-ran's friend 
Jang Hyun-sung as Kang Hyuk-soo, Kyung-joon's uncle
Go Soo-hee as Lee Kyung-mi, Kyung-joon's aunt-in-law
Im Ji-eun as Kang Hee-soo, Kyung-joon's mother
Lee Hee-jin as the bride (cameo, episode 1)

Production

Original soundtrack

Ratings

Awards and nominations

References

External links
  
 
 

2012 South Korean television series debuts
2012 South Korean television series endings
Korean Broadcasting System television dramas
Korean-language television shows
South Korean romantic comedy television series
South Korean fantasy television series
Television shows written by the Hong sisters
Television series by Bon Factory Worldwide